Doble Vida (Spanish for Double Life) is the fourth album recorded by Argentine rock band Soda Stereo, released on 15 September 1988. It was remastered in 2007 at Sterling Sound in New York.

Track listing
 "Picnic en el 4º B" (Cerati / Bosio / Alberti) (Picnic in 4º B) – 3:41
 "En la Ciudad de la Furia" (Cerati) (In the City of Fury) – 5:52
 "Lo Que Sangra (La Cúpula)" (Cerati) (What bleeds (The Dome)) – 4:36
 "En el Borde" (Cerati / Bosio / Coleman) (On the Edge)  – 4:44
 "Languis" (Cerati / Bosio / Alberti / Sais) (The Languid)  – 4:00
 "Día Común - Doble Vida" (Cerati / Alberti) (Common Day (Double Life)) – 4:41
 "Corazón Delator" (Cerati) (Tell-Tale Heart) – 5:14
 "El Ritmo de Tus Ojos" (Cerati / Bosio) (The Rhythm of Your Eyes)  – 3:59
 "Terapia de Amor Intensiva" (Cerati / Coleman / Alberti) (Intensive Love Therapy) – 5:41

All lyrics written by Gustavo Cerati.

Personnel
Soda Stereo
 Gustavo Cerati – lead vocals, electric and acoustic guitars
 Zeta Bosio – bass guitar, backing vocals
 Charly Alberti – drums, percussion

Additional personnel
 Daniel Sais - keyboards
 Lenny Pickett - tenor saxophone
 Marcelo Sánchez - saxophone
 Chris Botti - trumpet
 Carlos Alomar – producer, lead guitar on "Lo Que Sangra (La Cupula)", rap on "En El Borde", backing vocals

References

External links
 Official website
 Discography

1988 albums
Soda Stereo albums
CBS Records albums
Columbia Records albums
Sony Music Argentina albums